Spanić may refer to:
Daniela Spanic, (born 1973), Venezuelan model and actress, twin sister of Gabriela
Gabriela Spanic, (born 1973), Venezuelan actress, twin sister of Daniela
Nikola Spanić (1633–1707), Croatian Roman Catholic bishop

See also
Spanović
Spani family

Croatian surnames